Rose Are for the Rich is a 1987 American two-part, four-hour made-for-television drama film starring Lisa Hartman, Bruce Dern, Joe Penny, Richard Masur and Howard Duff. The film is directed by Michael Miller and written by Judith Paige Mitchell, based on the 1986 novel of the same name by Jonell Lawson. It was originally broadcast on CBS on May 17 and 19, 1987.

Plot
In a small town in Appalachia, Autumn's father died in a coal mining accident, and her boyfriend Lonnie died the same way. She thinks that the fatalities would not have happened if the owner of the mines, Douglas Osbourne, was concerned about others. His son, Brian Osbourne, is angry with his father because of how he treats others, so he decides to not inherit the business. Due to her belief that Douglas murdered her husband because of his disregard for others, Autmn decides to go up against him and his business. Autumn becomes a successful businesswoman by working at a store and a bar. Both the store owner and bar owner fall in love with her, but she is only interested in stopping Douglas.

Cast
Lisa Hartman as Autumn McAvin Norton Corbett Osborne
Bruce Dern as Douglas Osborne
Joe Penny as Lloyd Murphy
Richard Masur as Everett Corbett
Howard Duff as Denton
Morgan Stevens as Brian Osborne
Sharon Wyatt as Harriet Osborne
Jim Youngs as Lonnie Norton
Betty Buckley as Ella

Reception
Tom Jicha, writing for Miami News, said, "The soapy plot is preposterous, tedious, disjointed and predictable." A reviewer for Schenectady Gazette, said, "This is silly stuff, getting sillier by the hour". Tom Shales, of the Washington Post, ""Roses Are for the Rich" has enough storm and schmaltz-and, indeed, enough on-screen breeding, too-to loom as a crowd pleaser. Provided it's a very docile crowd. As these things go it is haplessly entertaining."

References

External links

1987 television films
1987 films
1987 drama films
CBS network films
Films set in Appalachia
American drama television films
Films directed by Michael Miller (director)
1980s English-language films
1980s American films